Balthasaria schliebenii is a species of plant in the Pentaphylacaceae family. It is found in the Democratic Republic of the Congo, Rwanda, and Tanzania.

References

Pentaphylacaceae
Near threatened plants
Taxonomy articles created by Polbot